René Jean (born 20 April 1931) is a French former rugby league player and coach. He played as a halfback.

During his entire career, he played for Avignon, with which he won the Lord Derby Cup in 1955 and 1956, as well disputing the French Championship final in 1957. Thanks to his club performances, he represented France 9 times between 1956 and 1959, taking part at the 1957 Rugby League World Cup.

Biography 
He was called up for the France national team to play the 1957 Rugby League World Cup alongside his teammates Augustin Parent, Jacques Merquey and Jean Rouqueirol. He also played for SO Avignon at club level, alongside Jacques Merquey, André Savonne, Jean Rouqueirol, Guy Delaye and Jacques Fabre.

Honours

Rugby league 
 Team honours:
 Lord Derby Cup: Champion in 1955 and 1956 (Avignon), Runner-up in 1958 and 1959 (Avignon)
French Championship: Runner-up in 1957 (Avignon)

References

External links
René Jean profile at rugbyleagueproject.com

1931 births
Possibly living people
Sportspeople from Vaucluse
French rugby league players
Rugby league halfbacks
Sporting Olympique Avignon players